Carrefour Gros Chaudiere is a village in the Tiburon commune of the Chardonnières Arrondissement, in the Sud department of Haiti.

See also
Bon Pas
Conete
Dalmate
Galette Sèche
Perion
Plansinte  
Tiburon

References

Populated places in Sud (department)